WJTL (90.3 FM) is a non-commercial radio station broadcasting a Contemporary Christian format. Licensed in Lancaster, Pennsylvania, United States, the station serves the Lancaster, Harrisburg, York, and Lebanon markets. The station is currently owned by Creative Ministries, Inc. Their current program director and station managers are John Shirk and Fred McNaughton. The station started on August 28, 1984, and switched to a 24-hour stereo format in 1985. WJTL was Lancaster's first Christian Contemporary station. WJTL's transmitter is located on Prospect Road in Ironville, Pennsylvania.

References

External links
http://wjtl.com/stationinfo/

Mass media in Lancaster, Pennsylvania
Contemporary Christian radio stations in the United States
Radio stations established in 1984
JTL